Mayfair Laundry Is an American Rock band from Los Angeles, California, who started making music together in 1996. They released two studio albums, Scrub (1998) and New and Improved (1999). They then took a 20+ year hiatus while exploring solo projects, production work, and more. In 2022 they reunited to release their first new music in many years.

Background
The band originated in Los Angeles, California, in 1996, with their members being vocalist Shannon Woolner, guitarist, Frank Sandoval, bassist, Paul Dexter, and drummer, David Snow, while they would remain together for the first album. Their second album was made with vocalist Kim Sipus Dexter, while bringing in Steve Latanation and Mark Stitts in the studio to perform other instruments.

Music history
Their first studio album, Scrub, was released on April 28, 1998, by Organic Records. While the second studio album, New and Improved, was released by Planet Records, on December 14, 1999.

Members
Past members
 Kim Sipus Dexter
 Shannon Woolner
 Frank Sandoval
 Paul Dexter
 David Snow

Discography
Studio albums
 Scrub (April 28, 1998, Organic)
 New and Improved (December 14, 1999, Planet)

References

External links

CM nexus Profile

American Christian musical groups
Musical groups established in 1996
Musical groups disestablished in 2006
Musical groups from California
1996 establishments in California
2006 establishments in California